Minarapa Rangihatuake (?–1893) was a New Zealand Methodist missionary. Of Māori descent, he identified with the Nga Mahanga (Taranaki) iwi. He was active from about 1839 in Taranaki.

References

1893 deaths
New Zealand Māori religious leaders
New Zealand Methodist missionaries
Year of birth missing
Methodist missionaries in New Zealand